John James Chanel Mora is a New Zealand media personality.

Mora was born in Christchurch. He attended Otago Boys' High School from 1967 to 1971. His broadcasting career began on radio in Dunedin, where he had studied at the University of Otago. During his time at university, Mora had been editor of the university's newspaper, Critic.

From the mid-1990s Mora was a reporter on the television current affairs series Holmes, and has since presented several light entertainment shows, notably lifestyle TV shows such as Mucking In.

He is currently hosts the Sunday morning programme on Radio New Zealand. In early 2019 he exchanged shows with Wallace Chapman who hosts a weekday afternoon show "the Panel", until 2015 he was also host of the RNZ show Afternoons.

He lives in Auckland with his partner Mary Lambie.

See also
 List of New Zealand television personalities

References

External links
 Jim Mora profile at Radio NZ

New Zealand television presenters
Mass media people from Dunedin
Living people
Year of birth missing (living people)
RNZ National
People educated at Otago Boys' High School
University of Otago alumni
New Zealand radio presenters